Stefan Langerman false Swarzberg is a Belgian computer scientist and mathematician whose research topics include computational geometry, data structures, and recreational mathematics. He is professor and co-head of the algorithms research group at the Université libre de Bruxelles (ULB) with Jean Cardinal. He is a director of research for the Belgian Fonds de la Recherche Scientifique (FRS–FNRS).

Education and career
Langerman left his Belgian secondary school at age 13 and was admitted by examination to the École polytechnique of the Université libre de Bruxelles. He studied civil engineering there for two years before switching his course of study to computer science, and earning a licenciate.

After working as a user interface programmer for the Center for Digital Molecular Biophysics in Gembloux,
he moved to the US for graduate study at Rutgers University, where he earned a master's degree and then in 2001 a PhD. His doctoral dissertation, Algorithms and Data Structures in Computational Geometry, was supervised by William Steiger.
Next, before joining ULB and FNRS, Langerman worked as a postdoctoral researcher at McGill University with computational geometry researchers Luc Devroye and Godfried Toussaint.

Research

Langerman's research is primarily in computational geometry. Known for novel and often playful results such as "Wrapping the Mozartkugel" which earned him the moniker of a computational chocolatier, Langerman has made a number of scientific advances in fields as diverse as musical similarity, polycube unfolding, computational archaeology, and protein folding. Langerman's work in data structures includes the co-invention of the queap and the introduction of the notion of retroactive data structures, a generalization of the concept of a persistent data structure. He is the author or more than 240 publications, and has led scientific missions with other western scientists to collaborate with colleagues in North Korea.

Family
Langerman is also the founder of Langerman SPRL, a Belgian colored-diamond company based on the collection of Langerman's father Arthur Langerman, a dealer of colored diamonds who is also noted as an author and as a collector of anti-semitic posters.
He is the co-author with his father of a paper on Morpion solitaire, written jointly with another father-and-son pair, Martin Demaine and Erik Demaine. Both Stefan Langerman and his father are members of the Board of Trustees of the Arthur Langerman Foundation, a non-profit organization based in Berlin, which makes its founder’s unique collection of visual antisemitica available for research, educational and exhibition purposes.

Selected publications

References

External links

Arthur Langerman Foundation

Year of birth missing (living people)
Living people
Belgian computer scientists
Belgian mathematicians
Researchers in geometric algorithms
Université libre de Bruxelles alumni
Academic staff of the Université libre de Bruxelles